Marion O'Neill (born July 1, 1969) is an American politician serving in the Minnesota House of Representatives since 2013. A member of the Republican Party of Minnesota, O'Neill represents District 29B in central Minnesota, which includes the cities of Buffalo and Monticello and parts of Wright County.

Education and career
O'Neill attended Bemidji State University, graduating with a B.S. in applied psychology, and Regent University, graduating with a M.A. in counseling. She worked in the Minnesota Senate as a legislative assistant to Senator John Howe from 2010 to 2012.

Minnesota House of Representatives
O'Neill was elected to the Minnesota House of Representatives in 2012, following redistricting and the retirement of Bruce Anderson, who resigned to run for the Minnesota Senate, and has been reelected every two years since.

In 2017-18 O'Neill served as an assistant majority leader for the House Republican caucus. She serves as the minority lead on the Higher Education Finance and Policy Committee and sits on the Climate and Energy Finance and Policy, Rules and Legislative Administration, and Ways and Means Committees.

Electoral history

Personal life
O'Neill has two children and five grandchildren. She resides in Maple Lake, Minnesota. Her brother, Brian Daniels, also serves in the Minnesota House of Representatives.

References

External links

Rep. Marion O'Neill official Minnesota House of Representatives website
Rep. Marion O'Neill official campaign website

1969 births
Living people
Bemidji State University alumni
Regent University alumni
Republican Party members of the Minnesota House of Representatives
Women state legislators in Minnesota
21st-century American politicians
21st-century American women politicians
People from Maple Lake, Minnesota